Wanika B. Fisher (born June 16, 1988) is a member of the Prince George's County Council representing district 2. She was first elected to the council in 2022 as a Democrat. Previously, she served as a member of the Maryland House of Delegates representing district 47B from 2019 to 2022.

Early life
Fisher was born in New York, New York. Her father is a Yourba Nigerian and her mother is an Indian South African who moved to the United Kingdom as a teenager to escape apartheid. Her parents were small-business owners in Westchester County, New York. She graduated from the University of Maryland, College Park with a B.A. in government and politics in 2010. While attending the university, she became a member of the sorority Alpha Kappa Alpha. Fisher earned a Juris Doctor at the Dickinson School of Law, Pennsylvania State University in 2013 and was admitted to Maryland Bar. She then worked as an assistant State's Attorney in Prince George's and is now in private practice.

In the legislature
Fisher was sworn in as a Delegate on January 9, 2019, and assigned to the House Judiciary committee. She also serves at the Assistant Majority Leader.

In June 2021, Fisher announced that she would not seek re-election to the House of Delegates, instead opting to run for Prince George's County Council. Fisher won the Democratic primary election on July 19, 2022, defeating former state senator Victor R. Ramirez and activist Raymond Nevo, and later won general election on November 8, 2022.

References

Living people
Democratic Party members of the Maryland House of Delegates
University System of Maryland alumni
1988 births
21st-century American politicians
21st-century American women politicians
Women state legislators in Maryland
County commissioners in Maryland